Christen Friis Rottbøll (3 March 1727, at Hørbygård, Denmark – 15 June 1797, in Copenhagen) was a Danish physician and botanist: He was a pupil of Carolus Linnaeus.

Early life
Rottbøll  was born on the Hørbygaard estate at Holbæk, the son of Christen Michelsen Rottbøll  (died 1729) and Margrethe Cathrine Friis. His father was the manager of the estate but died in 1729. His mother was married second time to manager of Hagestedgaard Ole Nielsen Faxøe.

Education and career
Rottbøll  studied at the University of Copenhagen, first theology, then medicine, in which he took his doctorate degree in 1755 (De morbis deuteropathicis seu Sympathier). He then travelled abroad 1757–1761 to further his studies of medicine, and to study chemistry and botany – the latter subject at Uppsala University with Linnaeus.

From 1761, he was executive at the Botanic Garden in Copenhagen, and succeeded Georg Christian Oeder as its director in 1770. He was appointed professor at the Chair of Medicine in 1776 and received the title of "royal adviser" (konferensråd) in 1784.

Work on smallpox 
As a medical doctor, he studied smallpox and reformed the vaccination programme that had run in Copenhagen since 1755. He abolished pre and post treatment and instead advised systematic weakening of the inoculum before application.

Botany 
As a botanist, Rottbøll gave out the first comprehensive list of the Flora of Greenland, he published descriptions of plants from the Danish colonies in India collected by Johann Gerhard König, and similarly of plants from Suriname collected by Daniel Rolander. Corresponding with Lorenz Praetorius (1708-1781) of the Danish Moravian Church, Rottbøll also solicited the collection of plant specimens in 1766 by Moravians in North America.

Rottbøll named the plant genus Rolandra (Asteraceae) after Rolander and the genus Kyllinga (Cyperaceae) after Peder Kylling. Carolus Linnaeus the Younger named the genus Rottboellia (Poaceae) after him.

Personal life
Rottbøll  married three times. His first wife was Ursula Schnabel (1732-1767), a daughter of rector Bernhard Schnabel (1691–1754) and Sophie Rasmusdatter (1700–52). They married on 10 May 1762 in Roskilde. His second wife was Johanne Elisabeth Mangor (1740-1771), a daughter of pharmacist Christopher Heerfordt Mangor (1704–82) and Anna Saur (c. 1715–83). They married on 18 May 1768 in Trinitatis Church in Copenhagen. His third wife was Catharina Hedvig Wohlert (1750-1811), a daughter of turner Daniel Jacob Wohlert. They married on 29 September 1777 in Schleswig.

References 

18th-century Danish botanists
18th-century Danish physicians
University of Copenhagen alumni
Academic staff of the University of Copenhagen
1727 births
1797 deaths
People from Holbæk Municipality
Rectors of the University of Copenhagen
Burials at the Church of Our Lady, Copenhagen